Islamic Iran Freedom and Justice Organization (IIFJO) is a reformist political party in Iran, based in the city of Isfahan. It operates in fifteen provinces of Iran.

References

External links
Official organ

Political parties established in 1997
1997 establishments in Iran
Reformist political groups in Iran
Isfahan